TVOne Canada was a Canadian exempt Category B Urdu language specialty channel that was owned by TVOne Canada Broadcasting Inc.  It broadcast programming from TVOne Global, a popular television channel from Pakistan and Canadian content.  It featured primarily entertainment programming including comedies, dramas, soap operas but also airs news & lifestyle shows as well.

TVOne Canada officially launched on September 14, 2010 on Rogers Cable.  In March 2013, TVOne launched on Bell Fibe TV.  In 2014, it was sold to Tariq Bari Sheikh and was subsequently renamed TVOne Canada.

In November 2015, the channel ceased operations.  No announcement was made about the pending shut down and as such the official day it ceased operations is currently unknown.

See also
 TVOne Global

Digital cable television networks in Canada
Pakistani-Canadian culture
Television channels and stations established in 2010
Television channels and stations disestablished in 2015
Mass media of Pakistani diaspora
Mass media in Mississauga
South Asian television in Canada
2010 establishments in Ontario
2015 disestablishments in Ontario